Hans-Joachim Büttner (1900–1973) was a German stage and film actor. After the Second World War he appeared in East German films.

Selected filmography
 The White Demon (1932)
 Tugboat M 17 (1933)
 Hitlerjunge Quex (1933)
 A Door Opens (1933)
 Gold (1934)
 Pillars of Society (1935)
 His Late Excellency (1935)
 My Life for Maria Isabella (1935)
 A Strange Guest (1936)
 Commissioner Eyck (1940)
 Das kleine und das große Glück (1953)
 Stärker als die Nacht (1954)
 Die Millionen der Yvette (1956)
 The Mayor of Zalamea (1956)
 Wo Du hin gehst (1957)

References

Bibliography 
 Giesen, Rolf.  Nazi Propaganda Films: A History and Filmography. McFarland, 2003.

External links 
 

1900 births
1973 deaths
People from Coburg
German male film actors
German male television actors
German male stage actors